The 2016 ASUN women's basketball tournament was the 30th edition of the ASUN Conference championship. It took place March 4, 2016, through March 13, 2016, in several arenas. All games took place at the higher of the two teams competing with the addition of NJIT. The winner received an automatic trip to the NCAA women's tournament.

Format
The A-Sun Championship is a six-day single-elimination tournament. Eight teams will compete in the championship.

Seeds

Schedule

Bracket

See also
 2016 Atlantic Sun men's basketball tournament

References

External links 
Atlantic Sun Women's Basketball Championship Details

Tournament
ASUN women's basketball tournament